Ruaudin is a commune in the department of Sarthe in the Pays de la Loire Region of north-western France. Ruaudin is located in the canton of Écommoy and the arrondissement of Le Mans. The INSEE code is 72260 and the postal code is 72230. The minimum elevation is 47 meters and the maximum elevation is 66 meters. The population of Ruaudin was 2,862 in 1999, 3,322 in 2007 and 3,418 in 2017. The nearest town from Ruaudin is Mulsanne, which is just 4.8 kilometers away. Ruaudin gained district hood in 1787. The village had 144 active establishments at the end of 2018. There were 22 documented births in 2019.

Twin towns
Ruaudin has been twinned with the comune of Uggiate-Trevano in Italy since 2013.

See also
Communes of the Sarthe department

References

Communes of Sarthe